Stylidium laricifolium, commonly known as giant trigger-plant,  larch-leaf or tree triggerplant, or  is a species of flowering plant in the family Stylidiaceae and is endemic to eastern Australia. It is a perennial subshrub with many linear leaves crowded along its few stems, the flowers white to pale pink and arranged in a single main panicle and smaller racemes.

Description

Taxonomy
Stylidium laricifolium was first formally described in 1806 by Louis Claude Richard in Christiaan Hendrik Persoon's book Synopsis plantarum. The specific epithet laricifolium refers to the long, narrow leaves, which resemble the leaf form of plants in the Larix genus. The type specimen was probably collected during Nicholas Baudin's expedition to Australia, which included a visit to Port Jackson in 1802.

Distribution and habitat
Giant trigger-plant grows in forest in rocky places from south-east Queensland, along the coast and tablelands of New South Wales to eastern Victoria.

See also 
 List of Stylidium species

References 

Asterales of Australia
Carnivorous plants of Australia
Flora of Queensland
Flora of New South Wales
Flora of Victoria (Australia)
laricifolium